Robinson Ekspeditionen: 1999, was the second season of the Danish version of the Swedish show Expedition Robinson and it premiered on 11 September 1999 and aired until 3 December 1999. This season was the first to feature added twist to the game. Dan Martstrand went on to win the season with a 7–2 jury vote over Peer Stakroge becoming the first joker ever to win a season of Expedition Robinson in the world.

Finishing order

External links
http://www.bt.dk/nyheder/hvor-blev-de-af-robinson-1999
http://www.nielsklapperfisken.dk/Nyheder/tv3/index.html

Robinson Ekspeditionen seasons
1999 Danish television seasons
Danish-language television shows